Meredith Wooldridge Thring (17 December 1915 – 15 September 2006) was a British inventor, engineer, futurologist, professor and author.

Education and career
Thring was born in Melbourne, Australia, but moved to England when he was four years old.  His school was Malvern College. He obtained a double first class degree in Mathematics and Physics at Trinity College, Cambridge in 1937. He then joined the British Coal Utilisation Research Association, becoming Head of its Combustion Research Laboratory. In 1940, he married Margaret Hooley (died 1986), and they had two sons and one daughter.

In 1946, Thring became Head of the newly formed Physics Research group of the British Iron and Steel Research Association. In 1950, he moved to the University of Sheffield, becoming Professor and Head of the Department of Fuel Technology and Chemical Engineering in 1953. In 1964, he took up the position of Head of the Department of Mechanical Engineering at Queen Mary College of the University of London, where he remained until his retirement in 1981. He died in Exmouth, Devon.

Honours
Thring was awarded the Student Medal of the Institute of Fuel in 1938, and the Hadfield Medal of the Iron and Steel Institute. From 1962 to 1963 he was President of the Institute of Fuel. In 1964 he was awarded a ScD degree from University of Cambridge. He was a Fellow of the Institute of Physics (FInstP), the Energy Institute (FEI), the Institution of Mechanical Engineers (FIMechE), the Institution of Engineering and Technology (FIET), and the Institution of Chemical Engineers (FIChemE). He was one of the first Fellows of the Royal Academy of Engineering (FREng).

Work
Thring was a visionary who changed from science to engineering "because he wanted to make the world a better place". In his 1977 book How to Invent, he wrote "One can envisage a society in which man lives in near-equilibrium with his environment, with the minimum use of raw materials by fuel economy, complete recycling of all metals, no throw-away goods, all consumer goods built to last many decades, and near zero pollution.". In the same book he describes domestic and gardening tools, Intermediate Technology for less developed countries and robots to take the place of people in dangerous situations. However, these were not just imagining. At the University of Sheffield and Queen Mary College he was actively involved in robotics. He produced a stair-climbing robot, an autonomous fire-fighting robot, and one for clearing a table.  After his retirement he founded a charity called Power Aid to help developing countries. In 1969 he predicted a future in which factories would be largely automatic, controlled by a central computer, and supposed that this would reduce the human working week to 10 or 20 hours.

He studied combustion and other forms of energy generation, and was one of the founders of the International Flame Research Foundation.  This knowledge of energy was shown in his 1974 book Energy and Humanity which called essentially for a more rational and sustainable approach, with control of pollution.  He was also known as a teacher, and for his belief that engineers had an ethical obligation to improve life for all, but notably the underprivileged and disabled.

Books
The domestic open fire: a survey of research prior to 1937 M.W. Thring (London : Combustion Appliance Makers' Assn.) 1938.
The influence of port design on open-hearth furnace flames J.H. Chesters & M.W. Thring (London : Iron and Steel Institute) 1946.
Air Pollution. Based on papers given at a conference held at the University of Sheffield, September 1956. Edited by M. W. Thring (London: Butterworths Scientific Publications) 1957
Pilot plants, models, and scale-up methods in chemical engineering R. E. Johnstone & M. W. Thring (New York : McGraw-Hill) 1957.
The science of flames and furnaces M.W. Thring (London, Chapman & Hall) 1952.
Nuclear propulsion edited by M.W. Thring (London : Butterworths) 1960.
Pulsating combustion : the collected works of F.H. Reynst edited by M.W. Thring (Oxford : Pergamon) 1961.
The science of flames and furnaces, 2nd edition M.W. Thring (London, Chapman & Hall) 1962.
The principles of applied science M. W. Thring (Oxford, Pergamon) 1964.
Engineering: An outline for the intending student M. W. Thring, 1972 
Man, machines and tomorrow M.W. Thring, 1973 
Energy and Humanity M. W. Thring & R. J. Crookes,  1974 
Machines, masters or slaves of man? M.W. Thring, 1974, 
Strategy for Energy M. W. Thring, 1975 
How to invent M.W. Thring, 1977. 
The engineer's conscience M.W. Thring & E. R. Laithwaite, 1980 
Robots and telechirs : manipulators with memory, remote manipulators, machine limbs for the handicapped M.W. Thring, 1983 
Quotations from G.I.Gurdjieff's Teaching: A Personal Companion M. W. Thring, 1998

Patents

British Patents
GB Patent 535576 (1941) Gas producers
GB Patent 549142 (1942) Refractory material
GB Patent 553753 (1943) Electrostatic gas cleaner
GB Patent 572380 (1945) Crucible and the like furnaces
GB Patent 579324 (1946) Combustion of solid fuel
GB Patent 579823 (1946) Carbonization of coal and combustion of the carbonised residue
GB Patent 587821 (1947) Transportable heating unit
GB Patent 587823 (1947) Controlling the air supply in furnaces and like heating appliances
GB Patent 610950 (1948) Recording gas constituents
GB Patent 760430 (1956) Control of combustion processes
GB Patent 803528 (1958) Smoke-consuming domestic stoves
GB Patent 818718 (1959) Rotary regenerative heat exchangers
GB Patent 842024 (1960) Utilising the waste heat of furnace gases and in cleansing thereof
GB Patent 870446 (1961) The generation of electricity
GB Patent 877779 (1961) Devices to facilitate the lighting of domestic fires
GB Patent 895534 (1962) Electric-arc steel furnaces
GB Patent 896639 (1962) Open-hearth furnaces
GB Patent 985625 (1965) Continuous casting of metals
GB Patent 1023817 (1966) Sampling and analysis of steel
GB Patent 1127443 (1968) Fire detection and fighting apparatus
GB Patent 1111869 (1968) Continuous steel-making
GB Patent 1131233 (1968) Automatic equipment for detecting fires
GB Patent 2167542 (1986) Furnace for industrial waste

US Patents
US Patent 2515545 (1950) Controlling the combustion rate and composition of the combustion gases in the burning of coal
US Patent 2663272 (1953) Controlling the air supply in furnaces and like heating appliances
US Patent 3171877 (1965) Apparatus for Continuous Steel Making
US Patent 3201622 (1965) Generation of Electricity
US Patent 3312230 (1967) Dish-Washing Machines
US Patent 3522859 (1970) Walking Machine
US Patent 3764667 (1973) Process for producing pigment-quality titanium dioxide

References

The Guardian Obituary: Meredith Thring, 10 November 2006
The Independent Obituary: Professor M. W. Thring, 30 September 2006

1915 births
2006 deaths
20th-century British inventors
People educated at Malvern College
Alumni of Trinity College, Cambridge
Academics from Melbourne
Futurologists
British chemical engineers
Engineering academics
Academics of the University of Sheffield
Academics of Queen Mary University of London
Fellows of the Institute of Physics
Fellows of the Institution of Engineering and Technology
Fellows of the Institution of Mechanical Engineers
Fellows of the Royal Academy of Engineering